Robert and Bertram is a comedy play by the German writer Gustav Räder, which was first staged in 1856. It depicts the adventures of two wandering vagrants. It premiered in Dresden on 6 February 1856. It served as the basis for a variety of different stage versions, loosely modelled on it. It was later turned into an 1888 opera Robert and Bertram.

Adaptations
The play has been adapted into a number of films:
 Robert and Bertram (1915 film), a silent German film adaptation directed by Max Mack
 Robert and Bertram (1928 film), a silent German film adaptation directed by Rudolf Walther-Fein
 Robert and Bertram (1938 film), a Polish film adaptation directed by Mieczysław Krawicz
 Robert and Bertram (1939 film), a German film adaptation directed by Hans H. Zerlett
 Robert and Bertram (1961 film), a German film adaptation directed by Hans Deppe

References

Bibliography
 

1856 plays
German plays adapted into films
Plays set in Germany
Literary duos